The Comasche Prealps (also known as the Larian Prealps or the eastern Lugano Prealps) are a subsection of the Lugano Prealps. They are found in the Province of Como, Italy, and Canton Ticino, Switzerland.

They border:

 to the north with the Adula Alps (in the Lepontine Alps), separated by the San Jorio pass;
 to the east with the Orobie Alps and the Bergamasque Prealps (in the Bergamasque Alps and Prealps), separated by Lake Como;
 to the south they dissolve into the Po Valley;
 to the west with the Varesine Prealps (in the same alpine section) and separated by the Monte Ceneri pass .

Main peaks 
The main mountains, arranged by descending elevation above sea level, are:

 Pizzo di Gino - 2,245  m
 Camoghè - 2,226 m
 Gazzirola - 2,116 m
 Monte Bregagno - 2,107 m
 Monte Bar - 1,814 m
 Cima di Fiorina - 1,810 m
 Monte Generoso - 1,701 m
 Monte di Tremezzo - 1,700 m
 Monte Galbiga - 1,698 m
 Monte San Primo - 1,685 m
 Denti della Vecchia - 1,492 m
 Pizzo della Croce - 1,491 m
 Palanzone - 1,436 m
 Sasso Gordona - 1,410 m
 Monte Colmegnone - 1,383 m
 Corni di Canzo - 1,373 m
 Monte Bisbino - 1,325 m
 Sighignola - 1,320 m
 Bollettone - 1,317 m
 Cornizzolo - 1,241 m
 Monte San Salvatore - 912 m
 Monte Sasso - 618 m

References 

Lugano Prealps
Italy–Switzerland border